Roxton is a city in Lamar County, Texas,  United States. As of the 2010 census, the city population was 650 and 548 in 2020.

Geography

Roxton is located at  (33.545595, –95.724929).

Demographics

As of the 2020 United States census, there were 548 people, 238 households, and 164 families residing in the city. As of the census of 2000, there were 694 people, 280 households, and 190 families residing in the city. The population density was 797.3 people per square mile (308.0/km). There were 326 housing units at an average density of 374.5/sq mi (144.7/km). The racial makeup of the city was 74.78% White, 21.33% African American, 1.73% Native American, 1.15% from other races, and 1.01% from two or more races. Hispanic or Latino of any race were 2.59% of the population.

There were 280 households, out of which 30.7% had children under the age of 18 living with them, 48.2% were married couples living together, 16.8% had a female householder with no husband present, and 31.8% were non-families. 29.6% of all households were made up of individuals, and 18.2% had someone living alone who was 65 years of age or older. The average household size was 2.48 and the average family size was 3.08.

In the city, the population was spread out, with 29.5% under the age of 18, 7.8% from 18 to 24, 23.6% from 25 to 44, 19.7% from 45 to 64, and 19.3% who were 65 years of age or older. The median age was 37 years. For every 100 females, there were 82.6 males. For every 100 females age 18 and over, there were 77.2 males.

The median income for a household in the city was $25,000, and the median income for a family was $31,250. Males had a median income of $23,750 versus $21,016 for females. The per capita income for the city was $12,444. About 20.6% of families and 25.5% of the population were below the poverty line, including 36.5% of those under age 18 and 21.4% of those age 65 or over.

Education
The city of Roxton is served by the Chisum Independent School District. Until 2019, the Roxton Independent School District served Roxton. However, Roxton ISD closed after the 2018–19 school year due to financial hardships and consolidated into Chisum ISD.

References

Cities in Lamar County, Texas
Cities in Texas